Afonso, Hereditary Prince of Portugal (18 May 147513 July 1491) was the heir apparent to the throne of Portugal. He was born in Lisbon, Portugal, and died in a horse-riding accident on the banks of the river Tagus.

Heir apparent
Afonso, named after his grandfather, King Afonso V, was the only son of King John II and Eleanor of Viseu.  The king was very fond of him and named the island of Príncipe after him (príncipe meaning "prince" in the Portuguese language).

Marriage
Afonso's grandfather Afonso V of Portugal had sided with Joanna la Beltraneja, who was a rival for the throne of Castile against her half-aunt, Queen Isabella I of Castile. She was never considered legitimate and, when the king was dying, no one took her as a serious contender for the crown. Isabella was due to inherit the crown, but Afonso V was keen to interfere with the succession in Castile. In 1475 he married his niece Joanna, whom he considered the legitimate heir to the crown. Since her adulteress mother was his own sister, Afonso V had not only ambition, but the family honour to protect. He proclaimed himself King of Castile and León and prepared to defend his wife's rights.

King Ferdinand and Isabella, however, won the war of succession and, as part of the Treaty of Alcáçovas, signed in 1479, it was agreed that their eldest daughter Isabella would marry Afonso.  Isabella was also to come with a very large dowry that in practice represented the war compensation obtained by Portugal. In 1480, Prince Afonso, who at that time was five years old, went to live in the town of Moura with his maternal grandmother, Beatrice. In the early months of the following year, his future wife, the ten-year-old Isabella, joined him and lived there for about two years.

The wedding, by proxy, took place ten years later in the spring of 1490 in Seville. On 19 November of that year, Isabella arrived in Badajoz where she was welcomed by Afonso's uncle, Manuel, the future King Manuel I of Portugal, whom she would eventually marry six years after her husband's death. Afonso and Isabella were reunited in Elvas on 22 November and, on the following day, Isabella met her mother-in-law, Queen Eleanor, in the Convento do Espinheiro in Évora, where the court had gathered to ratify the marriage that had been celebrated earlier in Seville.

This wedding had the blessings of both Kingdoms. The queen of Castile, whose mother and nurse were Portuguese, wanted to strengthen the ties with Portugal, and, at the same time, this would allow her to "keep an eye on and control the steps of her eternal rival, Joanna la Beltraneja", through her daughter.

Death

In July 1491, the royal family was spending the summer in the Santarém District near the banks of the River Tagus. King John invited his son to swim with him. The young prince refused the invitation at first, but seeing that his father wanted him to keep him company, decided to join him.  According to the chronicle of Rui de Pina:

According to the same author, when Afonso's mother heard the news of the accident, stricken with grief, she ran, riding on a mule, accompanied by her daughter-in-law, to be with her son who was lying on the ground. Nothing could be done. As a sign of mourning, his parents decided to dress in black. The funeral rites were held at Batalha Monastery and Prince Afonso was buried there, also the resting place of his grandfather King Afonso V. His widow, Infanta Isabella, returned to Castile and even before the siege of Granada was lifted, she joined her parents in Íllora. The Catholic Monarchs abandoned the camp temporarily to be with their daughter and to console her.

Aftermath
King John tried without success until the end of his life to legitimize the ten-year-old Jorge, Duke of Coimbra, his illegitimate son. His wife, Queen Eleanor, was adamantly against having the king's bastard son occupy the throne, an opinion shared by the Catholic Monarchs, who, like Queen Eleanor, supported the claims of the Duke of Beja, Eleanor's brother, as the heir to the throne. In 1494, King John, whose health had worsened, executed his last will in which named his cousin and brother-in-law, the Duke of Beja, his successor. King John died in October 1495 and, in 1497, his successor, the Duke of Beja, now King Manuel I of Portugal,  married Isabella, Prince Afonso's widow.

Ancestry

References

Bibliography

 

 
 

1475 births
1491 deaths
House of Aviz
Deaths by horse-riding accident
Heirs apparent who never acceded
Princes of Portugal
Portuguese infantes
People from Lisbon
15th-century Portuguese people
Sons of kings
Accidental deaths in Portugal